Zinc finger protein Rlf is a protein that in humans is encoded by the RLF gene.

References

Further reading